{{DISPLAYTITLE:C18H22O6}}
The molecular formula C18H22O6 (molar mass: 334.36 g/mol, exact mass: 334.1416 u) may refer to:

 Combretastatin
 Combretastatin B-1